Sisindri  is a 1995 Indian Telugu-language comedy film directed by Siva Nageswara Rao and produced by Nagarjuna. The film stars Nagarjuna's son Akhil Akkineni (in his debut). Nagarjuna, Giri Babu, Tanikella Bharani, Sudhakar, Aamani, Sarath Babu and Subhalekha Sudhakar play supporting roles. Music is composed by Raj, his debut film. The film is inspired by the American film Baby's Day Out (1994).

Akhil Akkineni won Special Award For Best Child Actor at Filmfare Awards South. The film was dubbed in Tamil as Chutti Kuzhandhai.

Synopsis

A rich industrialist Sarath Kumar finds that his cousin Shivaji has misused his company funds and dismisses him. To settle scores, Shivaji abducts his one-year-old baby Sisindri with the help of Jakkanna, Akkanna and Madanna which makes Sarath Kumar and his wife Geetha feel scared about him. But Sisindri turns out to be smarter than his abductors.

Cast

Production
Siva Nageswara Rao decided to direct a film based on the American film Baby's Day Out (1994). Nagarjuna's son Akhil who was a one year old baby at that time made his acting debut as a child kidnapped from home.

Soundtrack

The music was composed by Raj. The lyrics written by Sirivennela Seetharama Sastry, released by the Supreme Music Company.

Box office
This movie celebrated 100 days in 2 centers and 50 days in 34 centers.

References

External links
 

1995 films
Films set in India
Films about babies
Indian children's comedy films
1990s Telugu-language films
1990s children's comedy films
Indian remakes of American films
Films about child abduction in India
Films shot in Andhra Pradesh
Films directed by Siva Nageswara Rao
Films set in Andhra Pradesh